Atlas Air, Inc. is a major American cargo airline, passenger charter airline, and aircraft lessor based in Purchase, New York. It is a wholly owned subsidiary of Atlas Air Worldwide Holdings. Atlas Air is the world's largest operator of the Boeing 747 aircraft, with a total fleet of 54 of this specific fleet type. In 2021, the airline had 4,056 employees and operated to more than 300 global destinations.

History 

In 1992, Atlas Air began operations when the airline's founder, Michael Chowdry, started leasing aircraft to airlines.

In 1993, China Airlines, the first customer, initiated operations with Atlas Air with one airplane on an aircraft and crew, maintenance, and insurance (CMI) agreement.

By 1995, Atlas Air began trading publicly.

In 1997, Atlas placed an order for 10 new Boeing 747-400F aircraft with another two orders for 747-400Fs placed in 1998.

On January 30, 2004, Atlas Air Worldwide entered Chapter 11 bankruptcy. In July 2004, the parent company completed its restructuring plan and emerged from Chapter 11 bankruptcy protection.

In 2006, Amnesty International released a report on extraordinary rendition, claiming that Atlas Air was one of the airlines used by the US government for rendering detainees. This was the basis for the song "Atlas Air" recorded by Massive Attack for the album Heligoland.

In 2007, Atlas Air began a multiyear training contract with the United States Air Force to provide training for the pilots of Air Force One. The contract also provided training for the Presidential Airlift Group. This program has been renewed several times and remains in place as of 2022.

In March 2010, Atlas Air was awarded the contract to operate the Boeing Dreamlifter (officially the Boeing 747 Large Cargo Freighter), transporting aircraft parts to Boeing from suppliers around the world. It commenced operation in September 2010 under a CMI contract.

In 2011, Atlas Air took the first North American delivery of the Boeing 747-8 Freighter (Boeing 747-8F).

The transaction included Worldwide Air Logistics Group, Inc. and its two operating subsidiaries, Southern Air, Inc. and Florida West International Airways, Inc.

On May 5, 2016, Amazon.com and Atlas Air announced a deal for Amazon.com to lease 20 Boeing 767s to fuel growth of its new Amazon air-freight service, branded as Amazon Air. The deal also warranted Amazon the ability to buy up to 30% stake in the company over the next seven years. Under the agreement, Atlas Air Inc. would provide aircraft and CMI for seven years. This move came after Amazon's similar deal with Air Transport Services Group for 20 aircraft, also to be branded under Amazon Air.

In March 2017, Atlas Air Worldwide Holdings shut down Florida West International Airways and cancelled the operating certificate.

In January 2021, Atlas Air announced the purchase of an additional four 747-8 freighters from Boeing. They will be the final four 747s to be built. These were to be delivered in 2022, when Boeing planned to shut the 747 production program.

On November 17, 2021, Atlas Air and Southern Air completed their merger with the transition to a single operating certificate.

On August 4, 2022, Atlas agreed to be bought by an investor group for $3.2 billion.

On January 31, 2023, the airline received the 1,574th and final 747 ever made - a 747-8F registered N863GT. As the last 747 to be made by Boeing, the aircraft features a decal of Joe Sutter, the designer of the 747, on the front, right side, and the words "forever incredible". Many Boeing employees and executives, including those who were part of the "Incredibles", the people who worked on the first 747 prototype, gathered at Boeing's Everett Plant to bid farewell to the final aircraft.

Operations 

Atlas Air's headquarters are in Purchase, New York, with a flight operations center located in Erlanger, Kentucky. Atlas Air operates flights on an aircraft and CMI and air charter basis for airlines, express operators, freight forwarders, charter brokers, global shippers, and the U.S. military, along with dry-leasing freighter aircraft. Atlas Air has global operations established in Africa, Asia, the Pacific, Europe, the Middle East, North America, and South America.

Crew bases are located at Anchorage–Ted Stevens, Chicago–O'Hare, Cincinnati, Los Angeles, Memphis, Miami, New York's New York–JFK, Ontario, CA, and Tampa.

Fleet 
, Atlas Air operates these aircraft:

Passenger service 
Atlas Air began operating a premium passenger private-charter service for the U.S.-Africa Energy Association  in conjunction with SonAir in 2010. The charter service consisted of two customized Boeing 747-400 aircraft provided by SonAir. The aircraft were configured to serve 189 passengers in a three-class configuration. The charter service, which became known as the "Houston Express", included three dedicated weekly nonstop flights between Houston and Luanda, Angola.

As of 2021, Atlas Air owned a fleet of 10 B747 and B767 passenger aircraft available for lease in the passenger charter market.

As of 2017, Atlas Air is the charter service for the Jacksonville Jaguars.

Accidents and incidents 
 January 24, 2005: Atlas Air Flight 8995, a Boeing 747-212BSF, aircraft registration N808MC, overran the runway at Düsseldorf Airport due to poor braking action caused by unexpectedly heavy snow accumulation from an ongoing snowstorm. The aircraft was written off.
 February 2, 2008: Cargo aboard an Atlas Air Boeing 747-2D7B, N527MC, broke loose on takeoff from Lome Airport and penetrated the bulkhead, causing severe structural damage. The aircraft was written off.
 February 2010: The cover of part of the flaps on an Atlas Air Boeing 747 detached from the aircraft during landing in Miami, Florida. On May 17, 2010, a similar incident occurred when part of the inboard flaps on the right wing of an Atlas 747 separated from the aircraft. In May, alleging improper maintenance practices, the US Federal Aviation Administration proposed a fine of roughly  against the airline.
 November 21, 2013: The pilots of a Boeing 747-409LCF (Boeing Dreamlifter) operated by Atlas Air, N780BA, mistakenly landed at Colonel James Jabara Airport, instead of the nearby McConnell Air Force Base.  The aircraft was flown to McConnell the next day.
 July 27, 2018: Atlas Air Flight 8601, a Boeing 767-38EER, N641GT, sustained substantial structural damage, including a creased fuselage, in a hard landing at Portsmouth International Airport. The aircraft bounced on touchdown and "porpoised" five times, and the spoilers did not deploy due to a high throttle setting. The aircraft was carrying US troops home from the Middle East; no injuries were reported. The accident was attributed to pilot error, specifically "improper landing flare technique and the lack of the appropriate bounced landing recovery procedure". The aircraft was subsequently repaired and placed back in service.
 February 23, 2019: Atlas Air Flight 3591, a Boeing 767-375ER(BCF), N1217A, crashed into Trinity Bay near Houston on approach to George Bush Intercontinental Airport, killing both pilots and the single passenger, a commuting pilot from another airline. The US National Transportation Safety Board (NTSB) attributed the crash to pilot error and spatial disorientation; the NTSB also found that both pilots had experienced significant training difficulties and criticized Atlas Air's hiring practices.
 October 11, 2022: A Boeing Dreamlifter aircraft (N718BA) on its way to Charleston, South Carolina, from Taranto Airport as Atlas Air flight 5Y-4231, lost one of its front wheels after take-off from the airport. The wheel crashed near a highway adjacent to the airport. The flight crew decided to continue their flight and landed safely some 11 hours later at their destination.

See also 
 List of S&P 600 companies

References

External links 

 Official website
 

American companies established in 1992
Charter airlines of the United States
Airlines established in 1992
Airlines for America members
Cargo airlines of the United States
Companies based in Purchase, New York
Companies listed on the Nasdaq
1992 establishments in New York (state)
Airlines based in New York (state)
1995 initial public offerings
Companies that filed for Chapter 11 bankruptcy in 2004
Announced mergers and acquisitions